Mrugaalaya is a 1986 Indian Kannada-language film directed by  V. Somashekhar and produced by M. P. Shankar. The film stars Ambareesh, Geetha, Shivaram and Sundar Krishna Urs. The film has musical score by Rajan–Nagendra. The film was dubbed in Malayalam as Mrugasalayil

Cast

Ambareesh
Geetha
Shivaram
Sundar Krishna Urs
Sudheer
Rathnakar
Leelavathi
Pramila Joshai
Soumya
Chandralekha
Mysore Sharada
Baby Padmini
Rajashekar
Seema
Sheela
Pushpa
Hemashree
Baby Shobha
Shakunthala
Padma Thalakadu
Rajanand in Guest Appearance
Chethan Ramarao in Guest Appearance
Bangalore Nagesh in Guest Appearance
Mysore Lokesh in Guest Appearance
Honnavalli Krishna in Guest Appearance
M. P. Shankar in dual roles

Soundtrack
The music was composed by Rajan–Nagendra.

References

External links
 

1986 films
1980s Kannada-language films
Films scored by Rajan–Nagendra
Films directed by V. Somashekhar